Ait Sedrate Sahl El Gharbia is a commune in the Ouarzazate Province of the Drâa-Tafilalet administrative region of Morocco. At the time of the 2004 census, the commune had a total population of 14864 people living in 2110 households.

References

Populated places in Ouarzazate Province
Rural communes of Drâa-Tafilalet